Magaramkentsky District is an administrative and municipal district (raion), one of the forty-one in the Republic of Dagestan, Russia. It is located in the southeast of the republic. Its administrative center is the rural locality (a selo) of Magaramkent. As of the 2010 Census, the total population of the district was 62,195, with the population of Magaramkent accounting for 11.2% of that number.

Administrative and municipal status
Within the framework of administrative divisions, Magaramkentsky District is one of the forty-one in the Republic of Dagestan. The district is divided into eight selsoviets which comprise thirty-three rural localities. As a municipal division, the district is incorporated as Magaramkentsky Municipal District. Its eight selsoviets are incorporated as twenty-two rural settlements within the municipal district. The selo of Magaramkent serves as the administrative center of both the administrative and municipal district.

Settlements

Abandoned settlements
Khanzhalkala

References

Notes

Sources

Districts of Dagestan
